John Stephen Petercuskie (January 31, 1925 – April 20, 2018) was a former American football coach.

Military service
After graduating high school in the summer of 1942, he enlisted in the United States Marine Corps.  He was trained as a radar operator on the SCR-270 and attained the rank of Sergeant.  As a member of Air Warning Squadron 8, he took part in the Battle of Okinawa in 1945.

Coaching career
He served as head coach at Neshaminy High School from 1960 to 1965, garnering a 59–1–5 record.  He also served on the coaching staffs of college football teams at Dartmouth College, Boston College, Princeton University, Harvard University, Liberty University, and as an assistant coach (defensive line and special teams coach) on the Cleveland Browns from 1978 to 1984. In 2010, a bronze statue of his likeness was unveiled at Harry P. Franks Stadium in Langhorne, Pennsylvania.  He is a member of the Bucks County Sports Hall of Fame, Neshaminy Hall of Fame, Scranton Hall of Fame, East Stroudsburg Hall of Fame, Lackawanna County Hall of Fame, Luzerne County Hall of Fame  and Pennsylvania Coaches Hall of Fame. Petercuskie died at his home on April 20, 2018.

References

External links
 

1925 births
2018 deaths
American football guards
Boston College Eagles football coaches
Cleveland Browns coaches
Dartmouth Big Green football coaches
East Stroudsburg Warriors football players
Harvard Crimson football coaches
Liberty Flames football coaches
Princeton Tigers football coaches
High school football coaches in Pennsylvania
People from Old Forge, Lackawanna County, Pennsylvania
Players of American football from Pennsylvania
United States Marine Corps personnel of World War II
United States Marine Corps non-commissioned officers